Adam's Rib is an American sitcom broadcast on ABC from September 14 to December 28, 1973. Thirteen episodes were produced by MGM Television. The series was a TV adaptation of the 1949 MGM motion picture  of the same name.

Plot
Adam Bonner was a young assistant DA while his wife, Amanda Bonner, was a junior partner in a law firm. Their jobs often put them in conflict within the courtroom and, by extension, at home due to Amanda's crusade for women's rights.

Adam's Rib aired opposite The Brian Keith Show on NBC and the CBS Friday Night Movie. The trade publication Broadcasting described Adam's Rib as "a victim of feeble ratings".

Cast 

Peter H. Hunt created, produced, and directed Adam's Rib. Perry Botkin Jr. and Gil Garfield wrote the program's theme, "Two People".

Episodes

References

External links

1973 American television series debuts
1973 American television series endings
1970s American sitcoms
1970s American legal television series
1970s American workplace comedy television series
American Broadcasting Company original programming
English-language television shows
Television series by MGM Television
Live action television shows based on films
Television shows set in Los Angeles